Homer High School may refer to:

Homer High School (Alaska) in Homer, Alaska
Homer High School (Louisiana) in Homer, Louisiana
Homer High School (Michigan) in Homer, Michigan
Homer Central High School in Homer (town), New York